Siobhan Murphy  is a Canadian actress who has appeared in The Smart Woman Survival Guide in 2006, Men with Brooms in 2010, Max & Shred  in 2014,  Murdoch Mysteries in 2016 and Merry Happy Whatever in 2019.

Early life
Murphy was born in 1984 in Toronto, Ontario, and is an only child to her mother, a professor, and her father, a television journalist.  From a young age she enjoyed participating at the Young People's Theatre in Toronto.  From a young age, Murphy took piano and ballet lessons, but stopped age 16, to focus on acting. Murphy enrolled for a short course at York University, Toronto, in the Conservatory Acting program, learning classical and technical characteristics of acting performance. She graduated with a degree in acting in 2005.

Career 
In 2006, six months after graduating from university, Murphy landed a lead role as Liz Duncan (the producer), in The Smart Woman Survival Guide , making her debut screen appearance on television, in a series where for 36 episodes, Murphy honed her acting talent and confidence towards becoming a comedy actress. In 2009, Murphy starred in the short film Patient for which she received a Best Actress award at the Los Angeles Movie Awards.

Murphy appeared in several Hallmark movies,  and in 2014, had roles in Max and Shred . In 2016, Murphy made her first appearance as Ruth Newsome in CBC Television’s  Murdoch Mysteries in season 10 episode 8. In 2019, Murphy was a series regular in the Netflix dark comedy holiday series Merry Happy Whatever alongside Dennis Quaid, who played her father.

Filmography

Film

Television film

Television series

Awards and nominations

References

External links 
 
Omnipop artist profile

21st-century Canadian actresses
1984 births
Living people
Actresses from Toronto
York University alumni
Canadian film actresses
Canadian television actresses